Carl Andersson (22 September 1900 — 8 January 1981) was a Swedish footballer. He made two appearances for Sweden and 18 Allsvenskan appearances for Djurgårdens IF.

References

Swedish footballers
Sweden international footballers
Allsvenskan players
Djurgårdens IF Fotboll players
1900 births
1981 deaths
Association football wingers